Urbano Marín Vallejo (4 September 1935 – 5 May 2021) was a Chilean judge. He was president of the Supreme Court from 2008 to 2010.

References

1935 births
2021 deaths
20th-century Chilean judges
Supreme Court of Chile members
University of Chile alumni
People from Santiago
21st-century Chilean judges